Five Blind Boys may refer to:

Five Blind Boys of Mississippi, a gospel group from Jackson, Mississippi active since the 1930s. Archie Brownlee was their lead singer.
The Blind Boys of Alabama, also a gospel group founded in the 1930s led by singer Clarence Fountain.